Jean-Baptiste-Pierre Jullien de Courcelles (14 September 1759 – 24 July 1834) was a French historian and genealogist. He was born in Orléans and died at Saint-Brieuc, now in the Côtes d'Armor département of Brittany. He was chief administrator of the charitable Asile Royal de la Providence in Paris, president of the hospices of Orléans, and a knight of the Papal Order of the Golden Spur.

Publications 

The principal works of Courcelles are:

 Dictionnaire historique et biographique des généraux français depuis le XIe siècle, Paris: l'auteur, 1820–1823. In nine volumes:
 Volume 1; Volume 2; Volume 3; Volume 4; Volume 5; Volume 6; Volume 7; Volume 8; Volume 9

 Dictionnaire universel de la noblesse de France, Paris: au bureau général de la noblesse de France, 1820–1822. In five volumes:
 Volume 1, A–L; Volume 2, M–Z; Volume 3, A–M (supplement); Volume 4, N-Z (supplement); Volume 5 A-Z (supplement)

 Histoire généalogique et héraldique des pairs de France, des grands dignitaires de la couronne, des principales familles nobles du royaume, et des maisons princières de l'Europe, Paris: l'auteur, 1822–1833. In twelve volumes:
 Volume 1; Volume 2; Volume 3; Volume 4; Volume 5; Volume 6; Volume 7; Volume 8; Volume 9; Volume 10; Volume 11; Volume 12

References

1759 births
1834 deaths
French genealogists
19th-century French historians
French male non-fiction writers